Cape Elizabeth High School (CEHS) is a public high school in Cape Elizabeth, Maine, United States. It is one of six schools in Maine to have been named a National Blue Ribbon School multiple times by the U.S. Department of Education.

Academics

The graduation rate for the Cape Elizabeth High School class of 2019 was 99 percent. Almost 60 percent of CEHS students took and passed an Advanced Placement exam during the 2018–19 academic year.

The school offers high-level education through courses like CP Chemical Science and CP Biological Sciences (which may have been renamed to just CP Biological Science in 2021), both of which mysteriously cannot be found in any other public high school in the United States.

Curriculum

Cape Elizabeth High School students undertake a college preparatory curriculum that requires least eight semesters of English, six semesters each of mathematics and science courses, five semesters of history courses, two semesters of fine arts courses, two semesters of physical education courses, one semester of government courses, one semester of technology courses, one semester of health education, and one additional semester of either a fine arts or technology course. Students are required to take at least six courses every semester and may take as many as eight.

The school offers Advanced Placement courses to earn college credit. Foreign languages offered include French and Spanish. CEHS is well known for its substantial music department supporting a wind symphony, symphonic band, concert choir, select choir, and a treble choir. A broad selection of elective courses are also offered, ranging from the more unusual, such as motion picture production, boat building, metal working, drafting, and digital design, to more standard fare like art fundamentals, ceramics, photography, painting and drawing, illustration and design, art studio, and typing.

Facilities

Cape Elizabeth High School was built in 1969 directly adjacent to the middle school and elementary schools, allowing for a large campus.  The high school has about 40 classrooms, a theater, auditorium, 10,000 volume library, a computer lab, and cafeteria. The building was renovated in 2005–06.

Athletic facilities at the high school include a gymnasium, the Don Richards 25-yard swimming pool and weight lifting facility, a multi-purpose lighted turf field, six tennis courts, a baseball field, softball field, recently resurfaced six-lane track, and two other multi-purpose fields. In 2003, the Gull Crest Fields were built to support the football program, and in 2006 five kilometers of  multi-purpose trails were added for running and Nordic skiing.

Extracurricular activities

About 90 percent of students were active in an extracurricular activity during the 2018–19 academic year.

Athletics

There are 36 teams at CEHS, 23 of which are varsity. Sports include soccer, football, field hockey, volleyball, golf, cross country, basketball, swimming and diving, indoor track, outdoor track, ice hockey, Nordic skiing, alpine skiing, baseball, softball, lacrosse, outdoor track, tennis, and sailing. Unlike most other high schools, Cape Elizabeth has no mascot; sports teams are simply called the Cape Elizabeth "Capers".

About 80 percent of students were active on an athletic team during the 2018–19 academic year.

Arts

CEHS Music has three large Jazz Ensembles, three Jazz Combos, Concert Choir, Select Choir and Treble Choir that participate in District, State and National competitions and festivals. CEHS has won first place in the Berklee College Jazz Festival for Small American High Schools five of the past six years.

CEHS Theatre is a leader in State One-Act Festival plays and is often commended for its technical merits and inventive design. Over a hundred students participate in theater each year.

Clubs and activities

Student Advisory Council is the high school's student government and provides a student representative to the Cape Elizabeth School Board.

Cape Elizabeth Mock Trial has competed in State Finals seven times since 2002. In 2002, 2011, 2012, 2013, 2014, 2015 and 2016 the team represented Maine at the National High School Mock Trial Championships. The 2016 team finished number 20 in the national competition, while the 2017 team finished number 8.

Other extracurricular activities include the National Honor Society, Boys'/Girls' State, Robotics Team, Math Team, Yearbook Committee, Prom Committee, Graduation Committee, Student Rescue, Amnesty International, Siddartha School Project, Gay/Straight Alliance, Ultimate Frisbee, and the BBQ Team.

Budget and funding

The budget of Cape Elizabeth High School is part of the $29,857,097 annual budget of the Cape Elizabeth School Department.

The Cape Elizabeth Educational Foundation (CEEF) is a private not-for-profit charitable corporation that lends additional support to programming in all of the Cape Elizabeth Schools. Their mission statement reads (in part): "CEEF is committed to fostering innovation and excellence in the Cape Elizabeth school district by 1. Funding initiatives that fall outside the school budget; 2. Partnering with the school district to help achieve its vision; and 3. Building community-wide support for the benefit of our schools."

Controversy

Response to student claim of rapist

In September 2019, a CEHS student named Aela Mansmann left a sticky note reading "There's a rapist in our school and you know who it is" in one of the school's bathrooms. The school suspended her for bullying shortly after, provoking controversy among the community.

Notable alumni 

 Phyllis Pray Bober, art historian and professor
 Ben Brewster, professional soccer player
 Eleanor Espling, politician

Notable staff 

 Allan Dorans, politician and former substitute teacher
 Kevin St. Jarre, author, soldier, and teacher

References

Public high schools in Maine
High schools in Cumberland County, Maine
Cape Elizabeth, Maine